Herbert John "Dick" Thompson (September 21, 1881 - November 12, 1937) was an American U. S. Racing Hall of Fame  trainer of Thoroughbred racehorses. He was the trainer of the winning horse of the Kentucky Derby in 1921, 1926, 1932 and 1933.

In 1916, Thompson went to work as an assistant trainer to Cliff Hammon at the Idle Hour Stock Farm of Edward R. Bradley near Lexington, Kentucky. Following Hammon's death on July 28, 1918, he took temporary charge of the stable and was permanently appointed head trainer in March 1919.

Champions Trained by Thompson: 
 Blue Larkspur, American Horse of the Year, 1929
 Baba Kenny, American Champion Two-Year-Old Filly, 1930
 Burgoo King, American Champion Three-Year-Old Male Horse, 1932
 Barn Swallon, American Champion Three-Year-Old Male Horse, 1933
 Balladier, American Champion Two-Year-Old Male Horse, 1934

References

1881 births
1937 deaths
American horse trainers
United States Thoroughbred Racing Hall of Fame inductees
People from Detroit